Kuala Linggi is a state constituency in Malacca, Malaysia, that has been represented in the Malacca State Legislative Assembly. The state constituency was first contested in 1986 and is mandated to return a single Assemblyman to the Malacca State Legislative Assembly under the first-past-the-post voting system. , the State Assemblyman for Kuala Linggi is Rosli Abdullah from United Malays National Organisation (UMNO) which is part of the state's ruling coalition, Barisan Nasional (BN).

Definition 
The Kuala Linggi constituency contains the polling districts of Tanjung Dahan, Sungai Baru Hilir, Kampung Tengah, Permatang, Kuala Sungai Baru, Paya Mengkuang and Telok Gong.

Demographics

History

Polling districts
According to the gazette issued on 31 October 2022, the Kuala Linggi constituency has a total of 7 polling districts.

Representation history

Election results
The electoral results for the Kuala Linggi state constituency in 2004, 2008, 2013 and 2018 are as follows.

References

Malacca state constituencies